The 1962 Tour de France was the 49th edition of the Tour de France, one of cycling's Grand Tours. After more than 30 years, the Tour was again contested by trade teams. Frenchman Jacques Anquetil defended his title, winning his third Tour de France.

Classification standings

Stage 1
24 June 1962 — Nancy to Spa (Belgium),

Stage 2a
25 June 1962 — Spa (Belgium) to Herentals (Belgium),

Stage 2b
25 June 1962 — Herentals (Belgium),  (TTT)

Stage 3
26 June 1962 — Brussels to Amiens,

Stage 4
27 June 1962 — Amiens to Le Havre,

Stage 5
28 June 1962 — Pont l'Evêque to Saint-Malo,

Stage 6
29 June 1962 — Dinard to Brest,

Stage 7
30 June 1962 — Quimper to Saint-Nazaire,

Stage 8a
1 July 1962 — Saint-Nazaire to Luçon,

Stage 8b
1 July 1962 — Luçon to La Rochelle,  (ITT)

Stage 9
2 July 1962 — La Rochelle to Bordeaux,

Stage 10
3 July 1962 — Bordeaux to Bayonne,

Notes

References

External links

1962 Tour de France
Tour de France stages